The Hellenic Armed Forces are the military forces of Greece. They consist of the Hellenic Army, the Hellenic Navy, and the Hellenic Air Force.

The civilian authority overseeing the Hellenic Armed Forces is the Ministry of National Defense.

History

Conscription
Greece currently has universal compulsory military service for males from and over 18 years of age. Under Greek law, all men over 18 years of age must serve in the Armed Forces for a period of 9-12 months. Women can serve in the Greek military on a voluntary basis, but cannot be conscripted.

Budget
According to NATO sources in 2008, Greece spent 2.8% of GDP on its military, which translated to about €6.9 billion (US$9.3 billion). In 2008, Greece was the largest importer of conventional weapons in Europe and its military spending was the highest in the European Union relative to the country's GDP, reaching twice the European average.

Data for the 2017 fiscal year showed an estimated expense of €4.3 billion in constant 2010 prices, or €4.2 billion in current prices, equivalent to 2.38% of GDP (+0.01 change since 2016). For the 2018 fiscal year, the expenditure was estimated at €4.3 billion in constant 2010 prices or €4.1 billion in current prices, equivalent to 2.27% of GDP (-0.11% change since 2017).

Military personnel
Military personnel was estimated at approximately 106,000 for year 2017 and 105,000 for year 2018.

International operations
Greece is an EU and NATO member and currently participates primarily in peacekeeping operations. Such operations are ISAF in Afghanistan, EUFOR in Bosnia and Herzegovina and Chad, and KFOR in Kosovo. Greece also maintains a small force in Cyprus.

Component forces and their organization

Hellenic National Defense General Staff 

The Hellenic National Defense General Staff has the operational command of the Joint Armed Forces Headquarters and the units that operate under them. It is also responsible for organising and implementing routine operations and exercises of the Joint Armed Forces, coordinating and implementing operations during the management of wartime and peacetime crises and overseeing operations of the Hellenic Armed Forces outside Greek national territory.

Hellenic Army

The basic components of the Hellenic Army are Arms and Corps. The former is responsible for combat missions and the latter for logistical support. It is organized in Commands, Formations, and Units with the main being brigade, division and corps. Its main mission is to guarantee the territorial integrity and independence of the country.

Hellenic Navy

The Hellenic Navy incorporates a modern fleet consisting of strike units, such as frigates, gunboats, submarines and fast attack guided missile vessels and multiple types of support vessels, in order to be able to conduct naval operations that protect Greek national interests and guarantee the integrity of Greek territorial waters,  the mainland and the islands.

Hellenic Air Force

The Hellenic Air Force incorporates a modern aircraft fleet and congruent structure, combined with a comprehensive air defense system that consists of a widespread network of anti-aircraft weapons. The structure, which is overseen by the Air Force General Staff, includes the Tactical Air Force Command, the Air Force Support Command, the Air Force Training Command and a number of other independent defense units and services. Its main mission is to defend Greek airspace and to provide combat support to the Hellenic Army and the Hellenic Navy.

See also 

 Conscription in Greece
 Hellenic army
 Greek military ranks
 Hellenic Republic / Ministry of National Defense
 List of Greek military bases
 Military history of Greece
 Military history of Greece during World War II
 Athens War Museum
 War Museum of Thessaloniki

References

External links

 Hellenic Ministry of Defense – official website
 Hellenic National Defense General Staff – official website
 Hellenic Army General Staff – official website
 Hellenic Navy General Staff – official website
 Hellenic Air Force General Staff – official website
 Defense expenditures of NATO countries

 
Permanent Structured Cooperation